Mary Pierce was the defending champion, but she did not compete this year due to injury.

Lindsay Davenport won the title, defeating Venus Williams in the final, 6–4, 3–6, 6–2. With the win, Davenport ended Williams' 35-match winning streak, extending from the Wimbledon Championships earlier in the year.

Seeds
The top four seeds who played received a bye into the second round.

Draw

Finals

Top half

Bottom half

Qualifying

Seeds

Qualifiers

Lucky losers

Draw

First qualifier

Second qualifier

Third qualifier

Fourth qualifier

References

External links
 Main draw (ITF)
 Qualifying draw (ITF)

Generali Ladies Linz - Singles